The first series of New Zealand's Got Talent began airing on Prime on 8 September 2008 and ran to 28 October 2008. It consisted of 13 episodes.

In March 2008, Prime announced it was producing a version of New Zealand's Got Talent, in conjunction with South Pacific Pictures and FremantleMedia, with a grand prize of NZ$100,000.

In June, actress Miriama Smith was announced as the first of the show's three judges,  and television presenter Andrew Mulligan and radio host Jason Reeves were announced as the show's two presenters. In July, the final two judges were announced - former NZ Idol judge Paul Ellis and former Radio With Pictures presenter and television producer Richard Driver. 

It was the first and only series of New Zealand's Got Talent produced by Prime. The series had not delivered expected advertising revenue and in 2009, the network confirmed that they would not produce any further series. Subsequent to the series lackluster performance, the franchise rights were acquired by TVNZ for a more successful  second series run in 2012.

Auditions

The audition process started in May 2008 with an initial registration period for applicants. The top applicants were then invited to the judges auditions rounds in Auckland, Wellington and Christchurch in August. The series started with highlights from the judges shows, one episode per location, starting on Monday 8 September. From this round, the judges chose 32 contestants to go through to the semi-finals.

Semi-finals

There were four semi-finals with eight contestants in each show. Starting 29 September, the pre-recorded performance show screened on Mondays nights, followed by the live results show on Tuesday nights.

Semi-final 1 (29 September)

Semi-final 2 (6 October)

Semi-final 3 (13 October)

Semi-final 4 (20 October)

Final (27 October) 

The finals performances took place on Monday 27 October with the results revealed on Tuesday 28 October. As well as the performances from each of the finalists, each judge invited back a previously eliminated contestant. They were singer Paton Jacinto, pianist Kent Isomura and singer Melissa Nordhouse.

References 

2008 New Zealand television seasons